Irena Karpa (born 8 December 1980 in Cherkasy) is a Ukrainian writer, journalist, and singer.

Biography
Born in Cherkasy (Central Ukraine), Karpa grew up in Subcarpathian region (Prykarpattia).

Since 1999 she has been the frontwoman and songwriter of the band Faktychno Sami (later renamed "Qarpa"). Her first book was published in 2000 when she was a student at Kyiv National Linguistic University. In 2003 Karpa received a graduate's degree (magistar) in the English and French languages. After graduating she traveled Southeast Asia for a year. This sparkled the appearance of her book "Freud Would Cry".

From 2005 to 2008, she worked on TV (ICTV, Inter and MTV Ukraine). In 2004 she was a film director of "Kyiv. Limited Edition" and later in 2006 starred in Oleh Anpilohov's film "Autism" and A. Yakushenkov's film "Compote".

On May 17, 2008 Irena married journalist and writer Anton Friedland, but in 2009 they divorced. In September she married an American financier Norman Paul Hansen. They have two daughters.

Irena uses some strong words in her books. Some of her works have been translated into Polish, Czech, Bulgarian and Russian.

On 13 October 2014, according to Euromaidan, the minister of culture of the self-proclaimed "republic of Donetsk" signed a death warrant ordering that she be shot for publishing a cartoon considered inappropriate.

Literary works
 "Знес Паленого" (2000)
 "50 хвилин трави" (2004)
 "Фройд би плакав" (2004)
 "Перламутрове Порно (Супермаркет самотності)" (2005)
 "Bitches Get Everything" (2007)
 "Супермаркет самотності. Перламутрове порно" (2008)
 "Добло і зло" (2008)
 "Цукерки, фрукти і ковбаси" (2010)
 "Піца "Гімалаї"" (2011)
 "З роси, води і калабані" (2012)

Discography
See Qarpa

See also 
Contemporary Ukrainian literature

External links
 Official page 
 Blunt, erotic and obnoxious writing by Irena Karpa 
 Irena Karpa on goodreads.com
 Karpa's LiveJournal
 Irena Karpa on msbrand.net

1980 births
People from Cherkasy
Ukrainian writers
21st-century Ukrainian women singers
Living people
People of the Euromaidan
Musicians from Cherkasy